The 1928–29 Scottish Cup was the 51st staging of Scotland's most prestigious football knockout competition. The Cup was won by Kilmarnock who defeated Rangers in the final.

Fourth round

Semi-finals

Final

Teams

See also
1928–29 in Scottish football
1932 Scottish Cup Final – played between the same teams

References

Scottish Cup seasons
1928–29 domestic association football cups
Cup